The 2019–20 Mid-American Conference men's basketball season began with practices in October 2019, followed by the start of the 2019–20 NCAA Division I men's basketball season in November. Conference play began in January 2020 and concluded in March 2020. Akron won the regular season championship with a record of 14–4. Akron's Loren Cristian Jackson was named player of the year. The MAC tournament was cancelled due to the start of the COVID-19 pandemic. The NCAA tournament and all of the national postseason tournaments were cancelled.

Preseason awards
The preseason coaches' poll and league awards were announced by the league office on October 31, 2019.

Preseason men's basketball coaches poll
(First place votes in parenthesis)

East Division
 Bowling Green 69 (9)
 Buffalo 58 (3)
 Kent State 43 
 Miami 37
 Akron 33
 Ohio 12

West Division
 Toledo 69 (11)
 Northern Illinois 52
 Ball State 51 (1)
 Central Michigan 41
 Western Michigan 23
 Eastern Michigan 16

Tournament champs
 Bowling Green (6)
 Toledo (2)
 Buffalo (1)
 Kent State (1)
 Miami (1)
 NIU (1)

Honors

Postseason

Mid–American tournament

NCAA tournament

Postseason awards

Coach of the Year: John Groce, Akron
Player of the Year: Loren Cristian Jackson, R-Jr., G, Akron
Freshman of the Year: Jarron Coleman, G, Ball State
Defensive Player of the Year: Davonta Jordan, Sr., G, Buffalo
Sixth Man of the Year: Ronaldo Segu, So., G, Buffalo

Honors

See also
2019–20 Mid-American Conference women's basketball season

References